Kostretsy is a village in Maksatikhinsky District of Tver Oblast, Russia.

References

Rural localities in Maksatikhinsky District
Bezhetsky Uyezd